Jack Beattie may refer to:

Jack Beattie (ice hockey) (1906–1981), English ice hockey player
Jack Beattie (1886–1960), Northern Irish politician
Jack Beattie (footballer) (1912–1992), Scottish footballer

See also
John Beattie (disambiguation)